The 1995 New York Yankees season was the 93rd season for the Yankees, and their 71st playing home games at Yankee Stadium. Managed by Buck Showalter, the team finished with a record of 79–65, seven games behind the Boston Red Sox, and returned to postseason play for the first time since the 1981 season. They won the first American League Wild Card. In the Division Series, they would squander a 2–0 series lead, losing three straight games at The Kingdome and succumb to the Seattle Mariners in five games.

Offseason
 December 14, 1994: Jack McDowell was traded by the Chicago White Sox to the New York Yankees for a player to be named later and Keith Heberling (minors). The New York Yankees sent Lyle Mouton (April 22, 1995) to the White Sox to complete the trade.
December 15, 1994: Tony Fernández was signed as a free agent with the New York Yankees.

Regular season
On May 29, 1995, Derek Jeter made his major league baseball debut. It was in a game against the Seattle Mariners. Jeter had 5 at-bats and had 0 hits.
On September 11, 1995, pitcher Jack McDowell threw exactly three pitches and recorded three outs. This was accomplished in the ninth inning.

Season standings

Record vs. opponents

Transactions
April 12, 1995: Randy Velarde was signed as a free agent with the New York Yankees.
June 5, 1995: Josías Manzanillo was selected off waivers by the New York Yankees from the New York Mets.
June 8, 1995: Kevin Elster was released by the New York Yankees.
June 19, 1995: Darryl Strawberry was signed as a free agent with the New York Yankees.
July 1, 1995: Kevin Maas was signed as a free agent with the New York Yankees.
July 16, 1995: Dave Silvestri was traded by the New York Yankees to the Montreal Expos for Tyrone Horne (minors).
July 28, 1995: David Cone was traded by the Toronto Blue Jays to the New York Yankees for Marty Janzen, Jason Jarvis (minors), and Mike Gordon (minors).
July 28, 1995: Danny Tartabull was traded by the New York Yankees to the Oakland Athletics for Rubén Sierra and Jason Beverlin.
August 5, 1995: Luis Polonia was traded by the New York Yankees to the Atlanta Braves for Troy Hughes (minors).

Draft picks
June 1, 1995: Donzell McDonald was drafted by the New York Yankees in the 22nd round of the 1995 amateur draft. Player signed July 22, 1995.
June 1, 1995: Future NFL quarterback Daunte Culpepper was drafted by the New York Yankees in the 26th round (730th pick) of the 1995 amateur draft. Culpepper was drafted out of Vanguard High School.

Roster

Death of Mickey Mantle
Shortly before his death, Mantle videotaped a message to be played on Old-Timers' Day, which he was too ill to attend. He said, "When I die, I wanted on my tombstone, 'A great teammate.' But I didn't think it would be this soon." The words were indeed carved on the plaque marking his resting place at the family mausoleum in Dallas.

Mantle received a liver transplant at Baylor University Medical Center in Dallas, on June 8, 1995, after his liver had been damaged by years of chronic alcoholism, cirrhosis and hepatitis C. In July, he had recovered enough to deliver a press conference at Baylor, and noted that many fans had looked to him as a role model. "This is a role model: Don't be like me", he said. He also established the Mickey Mantle Foundation to raise awareness for organ donations. Soon, he was back in the hospital, where it was found that his liver cancer spread throughout his body.

Mickey Mantle died on August 13, 1995, at Baylor University Medical Center in Dallas. He was 63 years old. During the first Yankee home game after Mantle's passing, Eddie Layton played "Somewhere Over the Rainbow" on the Hammond organ at Yankee Stadium because Mickey had once told him it was his favorite song. The Yankees played the rest of the season with black mourning bands topped by a small number 7 on their left sleeves.

Phil Rizzuto, angered over the refusal of television station WPIX to give him a day off to attend his former teammate's funeral, abruptly resigned from his play-by-play announcing job with the station on August 19. He would return to call a partial schedule for the station in 1996 before retiring for good.

Game log

Regular season

|-

|-style=background:#cfc
| 5 || May 1 || 7:40p.m. EDT || Red Sox || W 5–3 || Howe (1–0) || Lilliquist (0–1) || Wetteland (3) || 2:30 || 17,412 || 4–1 || W1
|-style=background:#fbb
| 6 || May 2 || 7:36p.m. EDT || Red Sox || L 0–8 || Eshelman (1–0) || Hitchcock (0–1) || – || 2:25 || 13,694 || 4–2 || L1
|-style=background:#cfc
| 7 || May 3 || 7:36p.m. EDT || Red Sox || W 4–3  || Wickman (1–0) || Pierce (0–1) || – || 4:06 || 19,990 || 5–2 || W1
|-style=background:#cfc
| 8 || May 4 || 7:36p.m. EDT || Red Sox || W 5–3 || Ausanio (1–0) || Johnston (0–1) || – || 3:01 || 18,994 || 6–2 || W2
|-style=background:#cfc
| 15 || May 12 || 7:07p.m. EDT || @ Red Sox || W 12–2 || Hitchcock (1–2) || Sele (2–1) || – || 3:08 || 32,754 || 10–5 || W1
|-style=background:#fbb
| 16 || May 13 || 1:07p.m. EDT || @ Red Sox || L 4–6 || Eshelman (3–0) || Wickman (1–1) || Ryan (2) || 3:10 || 32,695 || 10–6 || L1
|-style=background:#fbb
| 17 || May 14 || 1:07p.m. EDT || @ Red Sox || L 2–3 || Peña (1–0) || Howe (1–1) || – || 2:49 || 32,526 || 10–7 || L2
|-style=background:#fbb
| 18 || May 16 || 7:35p.m. EDT || Indians || L 5–10 || Nagy (2–0) || Key (1–2) || – || 3:00 || 18,246 || 10–8 || L3
|-style=background:#fbb
| 22 || May 23 || || @ Angels || L 0–10 || || || || || || 12–10 || L1
|-style=background:#fbb
| 23 || May 24 || || @ Angels || L 1–3 || || || || || || 12–11 || L2
|-style=background:#fbb
| 24 || May 25 || || @ Angels || L 2–15 || || || || || || 12–12 || L3
|-style=background:#fbb
| 28 || May 29 || 8:07p.m. EDT || @ Mariners || L 7–8  || Ayala (1–0) || Bankhead (1–1) || – || 4:05 || 18,948 || 13–15 || L1
|-style=background:#fbb
| 29 || May 30 || 10:05p.m. EDT || @ Mariners || L 3–7 || Nelson (2–0) || Pérez (2–2) || – || 3:08 || 10,709 || 13–16 || L2
|-style=background:#fbb
| 30 || May 31 || 10:36p.m. EDT || @ Mariners || L 9–11 || Wells (2–3) || MacDonald (0–1) || Ayala (8) || 3:38 || 13,035 || 13–17 || L3
|-

|-style=background:#fbb
| 31 || June 2 || || Angels || L 2–3 || || || || || || 13–18 || L4
|-style=background:#fbb
| 32 || June 3 || || Angels || L 2–4 || || || || || || 13–19 || L5
|-style=background:#cfc
| 33 || June 4 || || Angels || W 11–3 || || || || || || 14–19 || W1
|-style=background:#fbb
| 38 || June 9 || 7:35p.m. EDT || Mariners || L 1–11 || Belcher (3–0) || Pérez (3–3) || – || 2:49 || 19,650 || 15–23 || L2
|-style=background:#fbb
| 39 || June 10 || 1:37p.m. EDT || Mariners || L 2–3 || Nelson (3–0) || Howe (1–2) || Ayala (9) || 3:03 || 25,279 || 15–24 || L3
|-style=background:#cfc
| 40 || June 11 || 1:37p.m. EDT || Mariners || W 10–7 || Howe (2–2) || Frey (0–3) || Wetteland (7) || 3:33 || 26,037 || 16–24 || W1
|-style=background:#cfc
| 45 || June 16 || 7:05p.m. EDT || @ Indians || W 4–2 || Wickman (2–1) || Poole (1–3) || Wetteland (8) || 3:04 || 41,643 || 19–26 || W1
|-style=background:#fbb
| 46 || June 17 || 1:05p.m. EDT || @ Indians || L 4–7 || Black (3–1) || Pettitte (1–4) || Mesa (17) || 2:53 || 41,662 || 19–27 || L1
|-style=background:#cfc
| 47 || June 18 || 8:05p.m. EDT || @ Indians || W 9–5 || McDowell (3–4) || Nagy (4–3) || Wetteland (9) || 3:13 || 41,667 || 20–27 || W1
|-

|-style=background:#bbbfff
|colspan="12"|66th All-Star Game in Arlington, TX
|-style=background:#fff
| 72 || July 17 || 8:06p.m. EDT || White Sox || T 1–1  || – || – || – || 2:16 || 22,707 || 33–38–1 || T1
|-

|-style=background:#fbb
| 96 || August 10  || 4:37p.m. EDT || Indians || L 9–10 || Poole (2–3) || Wetteland (1–2) || Mesa (31) || 2:58 || – || 49–46–1 || L2
|-style=background:#fbb
| 97 || August 10  || 8:06p.m. EDT || Indians || L 2–5 || Ogea (6–3) || Hitchcock (5–7) || Mesa (32) || 3:09 || 48,115 || 49–47–1 || L3
|-style=background:#fbb
| 98 || August 11 || 7:35p.m. EDT || Indians || L 4–5 || Tavarez (7–1) || Wetteland (1–3) || Mesa (33) || 3:59 || 33,739 || 49–48–1 || L4
|-style=background:#cfc
| 99 || August 12 || 8:07p.m. EDT || Indians || W 3–2 || McDowell (10–8) || Martínez (9–3) || – || 2:53 || 35,795 || 50–48–1 || W1
|-style=background:#cfc
| 100 || August 13 || 1:43p.m. EDT || Indians || W 4–1 || Cone (13–6) || Clark (6–5) || – || 2:27 || 45,866 || 51–48–1 || W2
|-style=background:#fbb
| 101 || August 14 || 7:09p.m. EDT || @ Red Sox || L 3–9 || Hanson (11–4) || Kamieniecki (3–4) || – || 3:04 || 34,319 || 51–49–1 || L1
|-style=background:#cfc
| 102 || August 15 || 7:08p.m. EDT || @ Red Sox || W 9–2 || Hitchcock (6–7) || Cormier (5–3) || – || 2:57 || 34,616 || 52–49–1 || W1
|-style=background:#fbb
| 103 || August 16 || 1:08p.m. EDT || @ Red Sox || L 4–7 || Gunderson (2–1) || Wickman (2–4) || Belinda (8) || 2:58 || 34,304 || 52–50–1 || L1
|-style=background:#cfc
| 104 || August 18 || || @ Angels || W 7–3 || || || || || || 53–50–1 || W1
|-style=background:#fbb
| 105 || August 19 || || @ Angels || L 3–5 || || || || || || 53–51–1 || L1
|-style=background:#fbb
| 106 || August 20 || || @ Angels || L 5–10 || || || || || || 53–52–1 || L2
|-style=background:#fbb
| 110 || August 24 || 6:37p.m. EDT || @ Mariners || L 7–9 || Nelson (5–1) || Wetteland (1–4) || – || 3:30 || 17,592 || 53–56–1 || L6
|-style=background:#fbb
| 111 || August 25 || 11:07p.m. EDT || @ Mariners || L 4–7 || Bosio (9–6) || Pettitte (6–8) || – || 3:01 || 28,130 || 53–57–1 || L7
|-style=background:#fbb
| 112 || August 26 || 10:05p.m. EDT || @ Mariners || L 0–7 || Johnson (13–2) || Hitchcock (6–9) || – || 2:49 || 41,182 || 53–58–1 || L8
|-style=background:#cfc
| 113 || August 27 || 4:36p.m. EDT || @ Mariners || W 5–2 || Kamieniecki (4–5) || Belcher (8–9) || Wetteland (23) || 3:32 || 24,913 || 54–58–1 || W1
|-style=background:#cfc
| 115 || August 29 || || Angels || W 12–4 || || || || || || 55–58–1 || W2
|-style=background:#cfc
| 116 || August 30 || || Angels || W 4–1 || || || || || || 56–58–1 || W3
|-style=background:#cfc
| 117 || August 31 || || Angels || W 11–6 || || || || || || 57–58–1 || W4
|-

|-style=background:#cfc
| 121 || September 4 || 1:05p.m. EDT || Mariners || W 13–3 || Pettitte (8–8) || Torres (3–9) || – || 3:00 || 24,885 || 60–60–1 || W1
|-style=background:#fbb
| 122 || September 5 || 7:35p.m. EDT || Mariners || L 5–6 || Wolcott (3–1) || Rivera (5–3) || Chalton (6) || 3:08 || 15,340 || 60–61–1 || L1
|-style=background:#cfc
| 123 || September 6 || 7:35p.m. EDT || Mariners || W 4–3 || McDowell (13–10) || Belcher (9–10) || – || 2:38 || 15,426 || 61–61–1 || W1
|-style=background:#cfc
| 124 || September 8 || 8:08p.m. EDT || Red Sox || W 8–4 || Cone (15–7) || Wakefield (15–4) || Howe (2) || 2:40 || 35,896 || 62–61–1 || W2
|-style=background:#cfc
| 125 || September 9 || 1:36p.m. EDT || Red Sox || W 9–1 || Pettitte (9–8) || Smith (7–8) || – || 2:39 || 47,719 || 63–61–1 || W3
|-style=background:#cfc
| 126 || September 10 || 8:07p.m. EDT || Red Sox || W 9–3 || Hitchcock (8–9) || Hanson (13–5) || – || 2:47 || 27,527 || 64–61–1 || W4
|-style=background:#cfc
| 127 || September 11 || 7:05p.m. EDT || @ Indians || W 4–0 || McDowell (14–10) || Martínez (10–5) || – || 2:52 || 41,835 || 65–61–1 || W5
|-style=background:#cfc
| 128 || September 12 || 7:45p.m. EDT || @ Indians || W 9–2 || Kamieniecki (5–5) || Hill (8–8) || – || 3:18 || 41,276 || 66–61–1 || W6
|-style=background:#fbb
| 129 || September 13 || 8:52p.m. EDT || @ Indians || L 0–5 || Nagy (14–5) || Cone (15–8) || – || 2:29 || 41,708 || 66–62–1 || L1
|-style=background:#cfc
| 141 || September 26 || 8:07p.m. EDT || @ Brewers || W 5–4 || Hitchcock (10–10) || Karl (5–7) || Wetteland (30) || 2:57 || 8,618 || 75–65–1 || W1
|-style=background:#cfc
| 142 || September 27 || 2:07p.m. EDT || @ Brewers || W 6–3 || Cone (18–8) || Givens (5–7) || – || 2:59 || 8,635 || 76–65–1 || W2
|-style=background:#cfc
| 143 || September 29 || 8:06p.m. EDT || @ Blue Jays || W 4–3 || Pettitte (12–9) || Castillo (1–5) || Wetteland (31) || 2:50 || 40,318 || 77–65–1 || W3
|-style=background:#cfc
| 144 || September 30 || 1:35p.m. EDT || @ Blue Jays || W 6–1 || Kamieniecki (7–6) || Leiter (11–11) || – || 2:40 || 49,233 || 78–65–1 || W4
|-

|-style=background:#cfc
| 145 || October 1 || 1:35p.m. EDT || @ Blue Jays || W 6–1 || Hitchcock (11–10) || Hentgen (10–14) || – || 2:55 || 47,182 || 79–65–1 || W5
|-

|- style="text-align:center;"
| Legend:       = Win       = Loss       = PostponementBold = Yankees team member

Postseason game log

|-style=background:#cfc
| 1 || October 3 || 8:07p.m. EDT || Mariners || W 9–6 || Cone (1–0) || Nelson (0–1) || – || 3:38 || 57,178 || 1–0 || W1
|-style=background:#cfc
| 2 || October 4 || 8:07p.m. EDT || Mariners || W 7–5  || Rivera (1–0) || Belcher (0–1) || – || 5:12 || 57,126 || 2–0 || W2
|-style=background:#fbb
| 3 || October 6 || 8:07p.m. EDT || @ Mariners || L 4–7 || Johnson (1–0) || McDowell (0–1) || Chalton (1) || 3:04 || 57,944 || 2–1 || L1
|-style=background:#fbb
| 4 || October 7 || 7:07p.m. EDT || @ Mariners || L 8–11 || Charlton (1–0) || Wetteland (0–1) || Risley (1) || 4:08 || 57,180 || 2–2 || L2
|-style=background:#fbb
| 5 || October 8 || 7:07p.m. EDT || @ Mariners || L 5–6  || Johnson (2–0) || McDowell (0–2) || – || 4:19 || 57,411 || 2–3 || L3
|-

|- style="text-align:center;"
| Legend:       = Win       = Loss     Bold = Yankees team member

Player stats

Batting

Starters by position
Note: Pos = Position; G = Games played; AB = At bats; H = Hits; Avg. = Batting average; HR = Home runs; RBI = Runs batted in

Other batters
Note: G = Games played; AB = At bats; H = Hits; Avg. = Batting average; HR = Home runs; RBI = Runs batted in

Pitching

Starting pitchers
Note: GS = Games started; IP = Innings pitched; W = Wins; L = Losses; ERA = Earned run average; SO = Strikeouts

Other pitchers
Note: G = Games pitched; IP = Innings pitched; W = Wins; L = Losses; ERA = Earned run average; SO = Strikeouts

Relief pitchers
Note: G = Games pitched; W = Wins: L = Losses; SV = Saves; ERA = Earned run average; SO = Strikeouts

ALDS

Farm system

References

External links
1995 New York Yankees at Baseball Reference
1995 New York Yankees team page at www.baseball-almanac.com

New York Yankees seasons
New York Yankees
New York Yankees
1990s in the Bronx